Dawsonia longifolia is a tall moss, growing to ~60 cm in height. This species may be a synonym of D. superba.

Distribution
Dawsonia longifolia may be found in the Philippines, Indonesia, Malaysia, and Australia.

References

External links
 

Polytrichaceae